Man of Letters is a 1984 television film about a womanising academic.

References

External links
Man of Letters at TCMDB

Australian television films
1984 films
Films directed by Chris Thomson (director)
1980s English-language films